Sebastian Kühner (born 15 March 1987) is a German volleyball player, who is a member of the German national team and SCC Berlin. He won the bronze medal at the 2014 World Championship.

Sporting achievements

National team
 2014  FIVB World Championship
 2015  European Games

References

External links
 DVV profile

1987 births
Living people
Volleyball players from Berlin
German men's volleyball players
Volleyball players at the 2015 European Games
European Games medalists in volleyball
European Games gold medalists for Germany
21st-century German people